Timothy Thompson Sawyer (January 7, 1817 – September 4, 1905) was a Massachusetts politician who served in both branches of the Massachusetts legislature,  and as the fourth mayor of  Charlestown, Massachusetts.

Early life

Sawyer was born January 7, 1817, in Charlestown, Massachusetts, to William and Susana (Thompson) Sawyer. Sawyer was educated in the Charlestown public schools.

Early career
After he left school, Sawyer went to work for an uncle who was engaged in the ship chancellery and hardware business. Sawyer later carried on the business himself for a number of years.

References
 Bacon, Edwin Monroe (1892), Boston of To-Day: A Glance at Its History and Characteristics, Boston, Ma: Post Publishing Company, p. 383.
Sawyer, Timothy Thompson (1902), Old Charlestown: Historical, Biographical, Reminiscent, Boston, MA: James H. West Company, p. 458.

Bibliography
 Old Charlestown: Historical, Biographical, Reminiscent (1902)
 Waters, Henry Fitz-Gilbert: The New England historical and Genealogical Register, Volume LX., pps. 1xx-1xxi. (1906).

Notes

1817 births
1905 deaths
Mayors of Charlestown, Massachusetts
Massachusetts state senators
Members of the Massachusetts House of Representatives
19th-century American politicians